The 2005 FIA WTCC Race Of Germany was the seventh round of the 2005 World Touring Car Championship season. It was held at the Motorsport Arena Oschersleben. Andy Priaulx took his first win of the season in the first race for BMW, and the second race was won by Alex Zanardi, also for BMW, at a track close to the one where he lost his legs in a crash in 2001.

Race 1

Race 2

Standings after the races

Drivers' Championship standings

Manufacturers' Championship standings

References

External links

Germany
Race